Dubrovnik Twilight (Dubrovački suton) is a Croatian film directed by Željko Senečić. It was released in 1999.

External links
 

1999 films
Croatian war drama films
1990s Croatian-language films
Films set in Dubrovnik
Yugoslav Wars films
Works about the Croatian War of Independence